Annie Key is a former Democratic member of the Ohio House of Representatives, representing the 11th District from 2001−2006. A former telephone worker with Ohio Bell and later AT&T, Key initially ran for the Ohio House of Representatives in 2000 to succeed Troy Lee James, who had held the seat for 34 years and no longer could run due to term limits. She succeeded in her bid, and was seated on January 3, 2001. She would go on to win reelection in 2002, and 2004. By her second term, Key was serving as the ranking Democratic member on the Ethics and Elections Committee.

In 2006, Key opted to forgo another term in the House to run for the Ohio Senate in an open seat. However, with the seat being incredibly Democratic, she faced a contentious primary against Shirley Smith and Claudette Woodard. In the end, Smith defeated Key, ultimately ending her political career in Columbus. She was succeeded by her aide, Democrat Sandra Williams.

Following her defeat, Key returned to Cleveland and remains active in the community.

Her daughter, Stephanie Howse, currently serves in the Ohio House representing the 11th District - Key's former district.

References

External links
The Ohio Ladies Gallery: Rep. Annie L. Key (D-Cleveland)

Democratic Party members of the Ohio House of Representatives
Living people
People from Camden, Alabama
Women state legislators in Ohio
1940 births
African-American state legislators in Ohio
21st-century American politicians
21st-century American women politicians
21st-century African-American women
21st-century African-American politicians
20th-century African-American people
20th-century African-American women